The John W. Kluge Center at the Library of Congress invites and welcomes scholars to the Library of Congress to conduct research and interact with policymakers and the public. It also manages the Kluge Scholars' Council and administers the Kluge Prize at the Library of Congress.

Established in 2000 within the restored Thomas Jefferson Building, the Center is named for its benefactor, John W. Kluge who donated $60 million to support an academic center where accomplished senior scholars and junior post-doctoral fellows might gather to make use of the Library's collections and to interact with members of Congress.

In addition, his gift established a $1 million Kluge Prize to be given in recognition of a lifetime of achievement in the human sciences.

The Kluge Center invites three levels of scholars: senior scholars, post-doctoral fellows, and doctoral candidates. Past scholars have included Václav Havel, Jaroslav Pelikan, John Hope Franklin, Robert V. Remini, Romila Thapar, Fernando Henrique Cardoso, Abdolkarim Soroush, David Grinspoon, Steven J. Dick, and Cardinal Theodore Edgar McCarrick among many.

The Kluge Center hosts frequent public lectures, conferences, symposia and other scholarly events based on the work of its scholars.

History

The Kluge Center was founded in 2000 with a gift to the Library of Congress by philanthropist John W. Kluge. The gift was announced on October 5, 2000, in a joint press conference by
Sen. Ted Stevens (R-Alaska), then Chairman of the Joint Committee on the Library, Rep. Bill Thomas (R-California), then Vice-Chairman of the Joint Committee on the Library, and James H. Billington, then the Librarian of Congress. The Center opened in summer 2002, welcoming its first scholars in July and August.

In June 2015, the Kluge Center celebrated its 15th anniversary with an event titled #ScholarFest. The event brought back to Washington some of the Center's best scholars for two days of "lightning conversations" on Capitol Hill. The Washington Post described the event as "speed dating for the intelligentsia."

Charter

The Kluge Center charter states that the Kluge Center will "bring a small number of the world's best thinkers into residence at the Library of Congress. The Center will assemble the finest minds characterized by broad historical or philosophical vision and capable of providing dispassionate wisdom and intelligent mediation of the knowledge in the Library's collections and of the information streaming into the Library via the Internet. They will have the opportunity through residence in the Jefferson Building both to distill wisdom from the rich resources of the Library and to stimulate, through informal conversations and meetings, Members of Congress, their support staffs and the broader public policy community. The Center's Scholars and Fellows will help bridge the divide between knowledge and power."

The charter establishes five positions for people of great scholarly accomplishment, Kluge Chairs, in the areas of American Law and Governance, Countries and Cultures of the North, Countries and Cultures of the South, Technology and Society and Modern Culture. The charter also stipulates that the Kluge Center will be home to a Henry A. Kissinger Chair in Foreign Policy and International Relations, Harissios Papamarkou Chair in Education, and Cary and Ann Maguire Chair in American History and Ethics. The charter adds that invitations to additional distinguished visiting scholars may be made to pursue special projects.

The charter commits the Center to accommodating younger scholars as Fellows, particularly scholars at the post-doctoral level. The selection of the Fellows is by competition.

The charter also states that the Kluge Center will be responsible for awarding the Kluge Prize.

Notable scholars

The Kluge Center has hosted several notable scholars from the academic and political worlds, including:
 Rolena Adorno, Historian, Kluge Chair in Countries and Culture of the South
 Jeffrey C. Alexander, Sociologist, Distinguished Visiting Scholar
 Marie Arana, Author, Distinguished Visiting Scholar
 Sarah Barringer Gordon, Legal Scholar, Maguire Chair in Ethics, and American History
 Jean Bethke Elshtain, Ethicist, Maguire Chair in Ethics and American History
 Fernando Henrique Cardoso, Politician & sociologist, Distinguished Visiting Scholar
 Manuel Castells, Sociologist, Chair in Technology and Society
 Steven J. Dick, Astronomer, NASA/Library of Congress Chair in Astrobiology 
 John Hope Franklin, Historian, Distinguished Visiting Scholar
 Aaron Friedberg, Foreign Policy analyst, Kissinger Chair in Foreign Policy and International Relations
 Vaclav Havel, Politician & playwright, Chair in Modern Culture
 Patricia O'Toole Historian, Distinguished Visiting Scholar
 Wendy Hall, Computer scientist, Chair in Technology and Society
 Stephen Houston, Historian, Jay I. Kislak Chair in the Study of the History and Culture of the Early Americas
 David Grinspoon, Planetary Scientist, NASA/Library of Congress Chair in Astrobiology 
 Maya Jasanoff, Historian, Kluge Fellow
 Cathleen Kaveny, Legal ethics scholar, Cary and Ann Maquire Chair in Ethics and American History
 Morton Kondracke, Journalist, Kemp Chair in Political Economy 
 Ivan Krastev, Political Scientist, Kissinger Chair in Foreign Policy and International Relations
 Mary E. Lovely, Economist, Library of Congress Chair in U.S.-China Relations
 Cardinal Theodore Edgar McCarrick, Theologian, Distinguished Visiting Scholar
 Raja Mohan, Foreign Policy analyst, Kissinger Chair in Foreign Policy and International Relations
 Major Owens, U.S. Congressman, Distinguished Visiting Scholar 
 Mark Noll, Historian, Maguire Chair in Ethics and American History
 Minxin Pei, Political Scientists, Library of Congress Chair in U.S.-China Relations
 Kenneth Pomeranz, Historian, Kluge Chair in Countries and Cultures of the North
 Robert V. Remini, Historian, Distinguished Visiting Scholar
 Wm. Roger Louis, Historian, Chair in Countries & Cultures of the North
 Susan Schneider. Philosopher, NASA/Library of Congress Cahir in Astrobiology, Exploration, and Scientific Innovation
 Neil Smelser, Sociologist, Chair in Countries and Cultures of the North
 Abdolkarim Soroush, Philosopher, Distinguished Visiting Scholar 
 Romila Thapar, Historian, Chair in Countries & Cultures of the North
 William Julius Wilson, Sociologist, Chair in American Law and Governance

Partnerships
The Kluge Center participates in several partnerships that bring scholars to the Library of Congress for periods of residential research. These include partnerships with:
 NASA - on the Baruch S. Blumberg NASA/Library of Congress Chair in Astrobiology
 Arts and Humanities Research Council - to bring scholars based in the United Kingdom to the Library of Congress for up to six months
 American Council of Learned Societies - for Recently Tenured Scholars to conduct research at the Library of Congress
 American Historical Association -  on the J. Franklin Jameson Fellowship in American History
 Bavarian American Academy - for students and graduates at Bavarian universities
 Black Mountain Institute at University of Nevada, Las Vegas

This article incorporates text from the Library of Congress website  which is a product of the US Government and in the public domain.

References

External links
 John W. Kluge Center

Library of Congress